This is a list of species of damselflies and dragonflies recorded in Australia.

Common names of species are linked, beside their scientific names.

The list is split into two groups: damselflies (suborder Zygoptera) and other dragonflies (infraorder Anisoptera).
Those groups are organized in Families and then Genera and Species.

Zygoptera (damselflies)

Coenagrionidae
genus: Aciagrion
Blue slim, Aciagrion fragilis

genus: Agriocnemis
Silver wisp, Agriocnemis argentea
Tropical wisp, Agriocnemis dobsoni 
Pilbara wisp, Agriocnemis kunjina 
Pygmy wisp, Agriocnemis pygmaea
Red-rumped wisp, Agriocnemis rubricauda
Agriocnemis thoracalis

genus: Archibasis
Blue-banded longtail, Archibasis mimetes 

genus: Argiocnemis
Red-tipped shadefly, Argiocnemis rubescens 

genus: Austroagrion
South-western billabongfly, Austroagrion cyane 
Northern billabongfly, Austroagrion exclamationis 
Pilbara billabongfly, Austroagrion pindrina 
Eastern billabongfly, Austroagrion watsoni 

genus: Austrocnemis
Tiny longlegs, Austrocnemis maccullochi 
Kimberley longlegs, Austrocnemis obscura 
Splendid longlegs, Austrocnemis splendida 

genus: Caliagrion
Large riverdamsel, Caliagrion billinghursti 

genus: Ceriagrion
Redtail, Ceriagrion aeruginosum 

genus: Coenagrion
Swamp bluet, Coenagrion lyelli 

genus: Ischnura
Aurora bluetail, Ischnura aurora 
Common bluetail, Ischnura heterosticta
Colourful bluetail, Ischnura pruinescens 

genus: Pseudagrion
Gold-fronted riverdamsel, Pseudagrion aureofrons 
Northern riverdamsel, Pseudagrion cingillum 
Flame-headed riverdamsel, Pseudagrion ignifer 
Dusky riverdamsel, Pseudagrion jedda 
Citrine-headed riverdamsel, Pseudagrion lucifer 
Blue riverdamsel, Pseudagrion microcephalum 

genus: Teinobasis
Red-breasted longtail, Teinobasis rufithorax 

genus: Xanthagrion
Red and blue damsel, Xanthagrion erythroneurum

Hemiphlebiidae
genus: Hemiphlebia 
Ancient greenling, Hemiphlebia mirabilis

Isostictidae
genus: Austrosticta 
Northern pondsitter, Austrosticta fieldi 
Eastern pondsitter, Austrosticta frater 
Kimberley pondsitter, Austrosticta soror 

genus: Eurysticta 
Pilbara pin, Eurysticta coolawanyah 
Coomalie pin, Eurysticta coomalie 
Kimberley pin, Eurysticta kununurra 
Queensland pin, Eurysticta reevesi 

genus: Labidiosticta 
Large wiretail, Labidiosticta vallisi 

genus: Lithosticta 
Rock narrow-wing, Lithosticta macra 

genus: Neosticta 
Southern pinfly, Neosticta canescens 
Tropical pinfly, Neosticta fraseri 
Forest pinfly, Neosticta silvarum 

genus: Oristicta 
Slender wiretail, Oristicta filicicola 
Elegant wiretail, Oristicta rosendaleorum 

genus: Rhadinosticta 
Northern wiretail, Rhadinosticta banksi 
Wiretail, Rhadinosticta handschini 
Powdered wiretail, Rhadinosticta simplex

Lestidae
genus: Austrolestes 
Western ringtail, Austrolestes aleison 
Slender ringtail, Austrolestes analis 
Blue ringtail, Austrolestes annulosus 
Inland ringtail, Austrolestes aridus 
Metallic ringtail, Austrolestes cingulatus 
Northern ringtail, Austrolestes insularis 
Iota ringtail, Austrolestes io 
Wandering ringtail, Austrolestes leda 
Dune ringtail, Austrolestes minjerriba 
Cup ringtail, Austrolestes psyche 

genus: Indolestes 
Small reedling, Indolestes alleni 
Cave reedling, Indolestes obiri 
Slender reedling, Indolestes tenuissimus 

genus: Lestes 
Dusky spreadwing, Lestes concinnus

Lestoideidae
genus: Diphlebia 
Sapphire rockmaster, Diphlebia coerulescens 
Tropical rockmaster, Diphlebia euphaeoides 
Giant rockmaster, Diphlebia hybridoides 
Whitewater rockmaster, Diphlebia lestoides 
Arrowhead rockmaster, Diphlebia nymphoides 

genus: Lestoidea 
Large bluestreak, Lestoidea barbarae 
Short-tipped bluestreak, Lestoidea brevicauda 
Common bluestreak, Lestoidea conjuncta 
Mount Lewis bluestreak, Lestoidea lewisiana

Megapodagrionidae
genus: Archiargiolestes 
Midget flatwing, Archiargiolestes parvulus 
Tiny flatwing, Archiargiolestes pusillissimus 
Little flatwing, Archiargiolestes pusillus 

genus: Austroargiolestes 
New England flatwing, Austroargiolestes alpinus 
Flame flatwing, Austroargiolestes amabilis 
Tropical flatwing, Austroargiolestes aureus 
Barrington flatwing, Austroargiolestes brookhousei 
Powdered flatwing, Austroargiolestes calcaris 
Milky flatwing, Austroargiolestes christine 
Golden flatwing, Austroargiolestes chrysoides 
Azure flatwing, Austroargiolestes elke 
Common flatwing, Austroargiolestes icteromelas 
Sydney flatwing, Austroargiolestes isabellae 

genus: Griseargiolestes 
Coastal flatwing, Griseargiolestes albescens 
Turquoise flatwing, Griseargiolestes bucki 
Grey-chested flatwing, Griseargiolestes eboracus 
Springs flatwing, Griseargiolestes fontanus 
Grey flatwing, Griseargiolestes griseus 
Alpine flatwing, Griseargiolestes intermedius 
Metallic flatwing, Griseargiolestes metallicus 

genus: Miniargiolestes 
Stream flatwing, Miniargiolestes minimus 

genus: Podopteryx 
Treehole flatwing, Podopteryx selysi

Platycnemididae
genus: Nososticta 
Black-winged threadtail, Nososticta baroalba 
Green-blue threadtail, Nososticta coelestina 
Northern threadtail, Nososticta fraterna 
Spot-winged threadtail, Nososticta kalumburu 
Koolpinyah threadtail, Nososticta koolpinyah 
Citrine threadtail, Nososticta koongarra 
Malachite threadtail, Nososticta liveringa 
Striped threadtail, Nososticta mouldsi 
Pilbara threadtail, Nososticta pilbara 
Orange threadtail, Nososticta solida 
Fivespot threadtail, Nososticta solitaria 
Melville Island threadtail, Nososticta taracumbi

Synlestidae
genus: Chorismagrion 
Pretty relict, Chorismagrion risi 

genus: Episynlestes 
Southern whitetip, Episynlestes albicauda 
Tropical whitetip, Episynlestes cristatus 
Intermediate whitetip, Episynlestes intermedius 

genus: Synlestes 
Forest needle, Synlestes selysi 
Tropical needle, Synlestes tropicus 
Bronze needle, Synlestes weyersii

Anisoptera (dragonflies)

Aeshnidae
genus: Adversaeschna
Blue-spotted hawker, Adversaeschna brevistyla (Coastal areas from Cooktown in northern Queensland, south to Victoria, and the Pilbara in Western Australia)

genus: Agyrtacantha
Trifid duskhawker, Agyrtacantha dirupta (Cape York Peninsula)

genus: Anaciaeschna
Australasian duskhawker, Anaciaeschna jaspidea (Coastal Queensland and Northern Territory)

genus: Anax
Kimberley emperor, Anax georgius (The Kimberley)
Green emperor, Anax gibbosulus (Coastal northern Australia from the Kimberley to the Gold Coast)
Lesser green emperor, Anax guttatus (Coastal northern Australia from the Kimberley to the Gold Coast)
Australian emperor, Anax papuensis (All Australia and islands)

genus: Austrogynacantha
Australian duskhawker, Austrogynacantha heterogena (Across Australia north of about Sydney)

genus: Gynacantha
Lesser duskhawker, Gynacantha dobsoni (Northern Australia)
Slender duskhawker, Gynacantha kirbyi (Northern Queensland)
Paddle-tipped duskhawker, Gynacantha mocsaryi (Northern Queensland)
Cave duskhawker, Gynacantha nourlangie (Inland and northern Australia)
Grey duskhawker, Gynacantha rosenbergi (Northern Queensland)

Austrocorduliidae
genus: Apocordulia
Nighthawk, Apocordulia macrops

genus: Austrocordulia
Sydney hawk, Austrocordulia leonardi
Eastern hawk, Austrocordulia refracta
Top End hawk, Austrocordulia territoria

genus: Austrophya
Summit mystic, Austrophya monteithorum
Rainforest mystic, Austrophya mystica

genus: Hesperocordulia
Orange streamcruiser, Hesperocordulia berthoudi

genus: Lathrocordulia
Queensland swiftwing, Lathrocordulia garrisoni
Western swiftwing, Lathrocordulia metallica

genus: Micromidia
Forest mosquitohawk, Micromidia atrifrons
Early mosquitohawk, Micromidia convergens
Thursday Island mosquitohawk, Micromidia rodericki

Austropetaliidae
genus: Archipetalia
Tasmanian redspot, Archipetalia auriculata (Tasmania)

genus: Austropetalia
Northern redspot, Austropetalia annaliese (Eastern New South Wales)
Waterfall redspot, Austropetalia patricia (Coastal New South Wales)
Alpine redspot, Austropetalia tonyana (Southern New South Wales and Victoria between 600–1800 metres elevation)

Brachytronidae
genus: Dendroaeschna
Wide-faced darner, Dendroaeschna conspersa

Cordulephyidae
genus: Cordulephya
Common shutwing, Cordulephya pygmaea (Coastal mid-southern Queensland to Victoria, also inland to 600 metres elevation)
Tropical shutwing, Cordulephya bidens (Coastal central Queensland)
Clubbed shutwing, Cordulephya divergens (Coastal southern New South Wales)
Mountain shutwing, Cordulephya montana (Coastal to alpine New South Wales)

Corduliidae
genus: Hemicordulia
Australian emerald, Hemicordulia australiae (Widespread in eastern and south-western Australia)
Fat-bellied emerald, Hemicordulia continentalis (Coastal Queensland)
Desert emerald, Hemicordulia flava (Central Australia)
Yellow-spotted emerald, Hemicordulia intermedia (Northern Australia)
Slender emerald, Hemicordulia kalliste (Northern Australia)
Pilbara emerald, Hemicordulia koomina (Pilbara, Western Australia)
Superb emerald, Hemicordulia superba (Northern New South Wales and south-eastern Queensland)
Tau emerald, Hemicordulia tau (Widespread across Australia)

genus: Pentathemis
Metallic tigerhawk, Pentathemis membranulata (Northern Australia)

genus: Procordulia
Western swamp emerald, Procordulia affinis (South-western Western Australia) 
Eastern swamp emerald, Procordulia jacksoniensis (Eastern New South Wales, Victoria, south-eastern South Australia, Tasmania)

Gomphidae
genus: Antipodogomphus
Southern dragon, Antipodogomphus acolythus Queensland except for Cape York and south-west, New South Wales except south-east and Victoria
Top End dragon, Antipodogomphus dentosus Top End of Northern Territory
Cape York dragon, Antipodogomphus edentulus Cape York, Queensland
Pilbara dragon, Antipodogomphus hodgkini Pilbara region of Western Australia
Northern dragon, Antipodogomphus neophytus Northern Australia, from Western Australia to Queensland
Spinehead dragon, Antipodogomphus proselythus Coastal Queensland

genus: Armagomphus
Armourtail, Armagomphus armiger South-western Western Australia.

genus: Austrogomphus
subgenus Austroepigomphus
Austrogomphus praeruptus (South-eastern South Australia, Victoria)

subgenus Austrogomphus
Murray River hunter, Austrogomphus angelorum (South-eastern South Australia, Victoria, western New South Wales)
Toothed hunter, Austrogomphus arbustorum (Northern Queensland)
Inland hunter, Austrogomphus australis (Victoria, south-eastern South Australia, southern Queensland, north-eastern and western New South Wales)
Western inland hunter, Austrogomphus collaris (South-western Western Australia)
Unicorn hunter, Austrogomphus cornutus (Victoria, eastern New South Wales, mid- and southern Queensland)
Northern river hunter, Austrogomphus doddi (North-eastern Queensland)
Yellow-striped hunter, Austrogomphus guerini (South-eastern Queensland, eastern New South Wales, Victoria, south-eastern South Australia, Tasmania) 
Pimple-headed hunter, Austrogomphus mjobergi (Northern Northern Territory, north-western Western Australia, north-eastern Queensland)
Kimberly hunter, Austrogomphus mouldsorum (North-western Western Australia)
Jade hunter, Austrogomphus ochraceus (South-eastern Queensland, eastern New South Wales, southern Victoria)
Tiny hunter, Austrogomphus pusillus (North-western Western Australia)

subgenus Pleiogomphus
Pale hunter, Austrogomphus amphiclitus (Eastern New South Wales, eastern and south-western Queensland)
Dark hunter, Austrogomphus bifurcatus (North-eastern Queensland)
Fork hunter, Austrogomphus divaricatus (Eastern Queensland)
Lemon-tipped hunter, Austrogomphus prasinus (North-eastern Queensland)

subgenus Xerogomphus
Western red hunter, Austrogomphus gordoni (Western Australia except the Kimberleys and central Australia)
Flame-tipped hunter, Austrogomphus turneri (Northern Australia, from Western Australia to Queensland)

genus: Hemigomphus
Black vicetail, Hemigomphus atratus Mid coastal Queensland
Zebra vicetail, Hemigomphus comitatus Mid and north coastal Queensland
Wallum vicetail, Hemigomphus cooloola Coastal New South Wales
Southern vicetail, Hemigomphus gouldii Coastal South Australia, Victoria, New South Wales, southern Queensland
Stout vicetail, Hemigomphus heteroclytus Coastal South Australia, Victoria, New South Wales, southern Queensland
Kakadu vicetail, Hemigomphus magela Northern Territory
Rainforest vicetail, Hemigomphus theischingeri Mid and northern coastal Queensland

genus: Odontogomphus
Pinchtail, Odontogomphus donnellyi (Northern coastal Queensland)

genus: Zephyrogomphus
Lilac hunter, Zephyrogomphus lateralis (South-western Western Australia)
Rainforest hunter, Zephyrogomphus longipositor (North-eastern Queensland)

Gomphomacromiidae
genus: Archaeophya
Horned urfly, Archaeophya adamsi
Magnificent urfly, Archaeophya magnifica

Libellulidae
genus: Aethriamanta
 Square-spot basker, Aethriamanta circumsignata (Northern Australia)
 L-spot basker, Aethriamanta nymphaeae (Northern Australia)

genus: Agrionoptera
 Red swampdragon, Agrionoptera insignis allogenes (Northern New South Wales, eastern Queensland, Northern Territory)
 Striped swampdragon, Agrionoptera longitudinalis biserialis (North-eastern Queensland)

genus: Austrothemis
 Swamp flat-tail, Austrothemis nigrescens (Southern Australia)

genus: Brachydiplax
 Palemouth, Brachydiplax denticauda 
 Darkmouth, Brachydiplax duivenbodei

genus: Camacinia
 Black knight, Camacinia othello

genus: Crocothemis
 Black-headed skimmer, Crocothemis nigrifrons

genus: Diplacodes
 Wandering percher, Diplacodes bipunctata (Widespread across Australia)
 Scarlet percher, Diplacodes haematodes (Widespread across Australia)
 Black-faced percher, Diplacodes melanopsis (Coastal southern Queensland, coastal New South Wales, Victoria)
 Charcoal-winged percher, Diplacodes nebulosa (Northern Australia)
 Chalky percher, Diplacodes trivialis (Northern Australia)

genus: Huonia
 Forestwatcher, Huonia melvillensis

genus: Hydrobasileus
 Water prince, Hydrobasileus brevistylus

genus: Lathrecista
 Australasian slimwing, Lathrecista asiatica festa

genus: Macrodiplax
 Wandering pennant, Macrodiplax cora

genus: Nannodiplax
 Pygmy percher, Nannodiplax rubra

genus: Nannophlebia
 Elusive archtail, Nannophlebia eludens
 Pilbara archtail, Nannophlebia injibandi
 Top End archtail, Nannophlebia mudginberri
 Common archtail, Nannophlebia risi

genus: Nannophya
 Australian pygmyfly, Nannophya australis
 Eastern pygmyfly, Nannophya dalei
 Artesian pygmyfly, Nannophya fenshami
 Western pygmyfly, Nannophya occidentalis
 Scarlet pygmyfly, Nannophya paulsoni

genus: Neurothemis
 Spotted grasshawk, Neurothemis oligoneura
 Painted grasshawk, Neurothemis stigmatizans

genus: Notolibellula
 Bicoloured skimmer, Notolibellula bicolor

genus: Orthetrum
 Speckled skimmer, Orthetrum balteatum
 Brownwater skimmer, Orthetrum boumiera
 Blue skimmer, Orthetrum caledonicum
 Rosy skimmer, Orthetrum migratum
 Slender skimmer, Orthetrum sabina
 Green skimmer, Orthetrum serapia
 Fiery skimmer, Orthetrum villosovittatum

genus: Pantala
 Wandering glider, Pantala flavescens

genus: Potamarcha
 Swampwatcher, Potamarcha congener

genus: Raphismia
 Spiny-chested percher, Raphismia bispina

genus: Rhodothemis
 Red arrow, Rhodothemis lieftincki

genus: Rhyothemis
 Iridescent flutterer, Rhyothemis braganza
 Graphic flutterer, Rhyothemis graphiptera
 Yellow-striped flutterer, Rhyothemis phyllis
 Sapphire flutterer, Rhyothemis princeps
 Jewel flutterer, Rhyothemis resplendens

genus: Tetrathemis
 Rainforest elf, Tetrathemis irregularis

genus: Tholymis
 Twister, Tholymis tillarga

genus: Tramea

Dune glider, Tramea eurybia
Common glider, Tramea loewii
Northern glider, Tramea transmarina
Narrow-lobed glider, Tramea stenoloba

genus: Urothemis
 Red baron, Urothemis aliena

genus: Zyxomma
 Short-tailed duskdarter, Zyxomma elgneri
 Large duskdarter, Zyxomma multinervorum
 Long-tailed duskdarter, Zyxomma petiolatum

Lindeniidae
genus: Ictinogomphus
Australian tiger, Ictinogomphus australis
Pilbara tiger, Ictinogomphus dobsoni
Cape York tiger, Ictinogomphus paulini

Macromiidae
genus: Macromia
Australian cruiser, Macromia tillyardi
Rainforest cruiser, Macromia viridescens

Petaluridae
genus: Petalura
South-eastern petaltail, Petalura gigantea (Coastal New South Wales)
Western petaltail, Petalura hesperia (Southwest Western Australia)
Giant petaltail, Petalura ingentissima (Coastal northern Queensland)
Coastal petaltail, Petalura litorea (Coastal northern New South Wales and southern Queensland)
Beautiful petaltail, Petalura pulcherrima (Coastal northern Queensland and Cape York)

Pseudocorduliidae
genus: Pseudocordulia
Circle-tipped mistfly, Pseudocordulia circularis
Ellipse-tipped mistfly, Pseudocordulia elliptica

Synthemistidae
genus: Archaeosynthemis
 Twinspot tigertail, Archaeosynthemis leachii
 Western brown tigertail, Archaeosynthemis occidentalis
 Eastern brown tigertail, Archaeosynthemis orientalis
 Spiny tigertail, Archaeosynthemis spiniger

genus: Austrosynthemis
 Turquoise tigertail, Austrosynthemis cyanitincta

genus: Choristhemis
 Yellow-tipped tigertail, Choristhemis flavoterminata
 Delicate tigertail, Choristhemis olivei

genus: Eusynthemis
 Variable tigertail, Eusynthemis aurolineata
 Mount Lewis tigertail, Eusynthemis barbarae
 Small tigertail, Eusynthemis brevistyla
 Cooloola tigertail, Eusynthemis cooloola
 Carnarvon tigertail, Eusynthemis deniseae
 Southern tigertail, Eusynthemis guttata
 Pretty tigertail, Eusynthemis netta
 Black tigertail, Eusynthemis nigra
 Swift tigertail, Eusynthemis rentziana
 Rainforest tigertail, Eusynthemis tenera
 Mountain tigertail, Eusynthemis tillyardi
 Barrington tigertail, Eusynthemis ursa
 Beech tigertail, Eusynthemis ursula
 Golden tigertail, Eusynthemis virgula

genus: Parasynthemis
 Royal tigertail, Parasynthemis regina

genus: Synthemiopsis
 Tasmanian spotwing, Synthemiopsis gomphomacromioides

genus: Synthemis
Swamp tigertail, Synthemis eustalacta (Eastern New South Wales, Victoria and southern South Australia)
Tasmanian swamp tigertail, Synthemis tasmanica (Tasmania) 

genus: Tonyosynthemis
 Clavicle tigertail, Tonyosynthemis claviculata
 Slender tigertail, Tonyosynthemis ofarrelli

Telephlebiidae
genus: Acanthaeschna
Thylacine darner, Acanthaeschna victoria (Coastal southern Queensland and northern New South Wales)

genus: Antipodophlebia
Terrestrial evening darner, Antipodophlebia asthenes

genus: Austroaeschna

Western darner, Austroaeschna anacantha (Coastal south-western Western Australia)
Mountain darner, Austroaeschna atrata (Australian Alps)
S-spot darner, Austroaeschna christine (Central coast of Queensland)
Wallum darner, Austroaeschna cooloola Southern coast of Queensland
Eungella darner, Austroaeschna eungella (Central coast of Queensland)
Alpine darner, Austroaeschna flavomaculata (Australian Alps)
Lesser Tasmanian darner, Austroaeschna hardyi (Tasmania)
Whitewater darner, Austroaeschna inermis (Coastal south-eastern Australia)
Grampians darner, Austroaeschna ingrid (Western Victoria)
Carnarvon darner, Austroaeschna muelleri (Inland southern Queensland)
Multi-spotted darner, Austroaeschna multipunctata (Southern coastal New South Wales to Victoria)
Sydney mountain darner, Austroaeschna obscura (Mountains around Sydney)
Swamp darner, Austroaeschna parvistigma (Coastal New South Wales, Victoria, southern South Australia and Tasmania)
Inland darner, Austroaeschna pinheyi (Carnarvon Gorge, Queensland)
Forest darner, Austroaeschna pulchra (Coastal southern Queensland, New South Wales and Victoria)
Sigma darner, Austroaeschna sigma (Coastal southern Queensland and New South Wales)
Tropical unicorn darner, Austroaeschna speciosa (Central coast of Queensland)
Conehead darner, Austroaeschna subapicalis (Coastal New South Wales and Victoria)
Tasmanian darner, Austroaeschna tasmanica (Tasmania)
Unicorn darner, Austroaeschna unicornis (Southern Queensland to coastal New South Wales, Victoria, Tasmania and South Australia)

genus: Austrophlebia
Southern giant darner, Austrophlebia costalis
Northern giant darner, Austrophlebia subcostalis

genus: Dromaeschna
Green-striped darner, Dromaeschna forcipata (Coast of Cape York Peninsula, Queensland)
Ochre-tipped darner, Dromaeschna weiskei (Coast of Cape York Peninsula, Queensland)

genus: Notoaeschna
Northern riffle darner, Notoaeschna geminata
Southern riffle darner, Notoaeschna sagittata

genus: Spinaeschna
Southern cascade darner, Spinaeschna tripunctata
Tropical cascade darner, Spinaeschna watsoni

genus: Telephlebia
Southern evening darner, Telephlebia brevicauda
Northern evening darner, Telephlebia cyclops
Eastern evening darner, Telephlebia godeffroyi
Tropical evening darner, Telephlebia tillyardi
Coastal evening darner, Telephlebia tryoni
Carnarvon evening darner, Telephlebia undia

References 

 
 
 
 

Australia
Dragonfly species